HD 31975 (HR 1606) is a star situated in the southern circumpolar constellation Mensa. It has an apparent magnitude of 6.28, which is near the threshold of naked eye visibility.

HD 31975 has a stellar classification of F9 V Fe−0.5, indicating that it is a F-type main-sequence star with a mild under abundance of iron in its atmosphere. At present it has 120% the mass of the Sun and 146% the radius of the Sun. It shines at double the luminosity of the Sun from its photosphere at an effective temperature of 6,165 K, giving it a yellow-white glow.

The Washington Double Star Catalog lists a faint M5 companion 16.5" away, which is related to the star.

References

F-type main-sequence stars
Mensa (constellation)
Mensae, 15
Durchmusterung objects
031975
1606
Double stars
M-type main-sequence stars
022717